The Ministry of Culture of Argentina is a ministry of the national executive power that oversees the government's public policy on the culture of Argentina.

The culture portfolio was first established in 1973 during the presidency of Héctor Cámpora as part of the responsibilities of the Ministry of Culture and Education; the first minister responsible was Jorge Alberto Taiana. The ministry existed only briefly before being demoted to a Secretariat. It would remain under the scope of the broader Ministry of Education until 2014, when it was re-established by President Cristina Fernández de Kirchner. Its current minister is, since 10 December 2019 and in the cabinet of President Alberto Fernández, Tristán Bauer.

History
The culture portfolio was first established as the Ministry of Culture and Education on 25 May 1973 upon the accession to the presidency of Héctor Cámpora; the first minister responsible was the physician and Justicialist Party politician Jorge Alberto Taiana. Taiana remained in office through the resignation of Cámpora, the interim presidency of Raúl Lastiri, the brief third presidency of Juan Domingo Perón and part of the presidency of Isabel Perón, and was succeeded by Oscar Ivanissevich in 1974.

During the last military dictatorship (1976–1983) the issue of culture and education was left, for the most part, in the hands of civilians. Upon the return of democracy in 1983, President Raúl Alfonsín mandated the creation of the Secretariat of Culture as a dependency of the Ministry of Education and Justice; the first Secretary was Carlos Gorostiza.

In 2014, President Cristina Fernández de Kirchner announced the establishment of a ministry dedicated exclusively to culture, with singer-songwriter Teresa Parodi being appointed to the new position. The ministry was again demoted to a Secretariat under the Ministry of Education with the cabinet reorganization imposed by President Mauricio Macri in September 2018, but this would be undone by the new administration of President Alberto Fernández upon its arrival to power in 2019.

Attributions
The attributions and responsibilities of the Ministry of Culture are specified in Article 23, section 5 of the current Law on Ministries (Ley de Ministerios), published in 2019. According to this law, the Ministry is in charge of assisting the President of Argentina and the Chief of the Cabinet of Ministers in all matters pertaining to culture, as well as designing and executing public policy, planning, programs and projects to stimulate and favor culture; elaborating and promoting policies that strengthen Argentina's cultural identities, promoting policies destined to the development of the economic activity of the cultural industry, directing policies of conservation and protection of Argentina's cultural heritage, promoting policies that safeguard cultural diversity, among others.

Structure and dependencies
The Ministry of Culture counts with a number of centralized and decentralized dependencies. The centralized dependencies, as in other government ministers, are known as secretariats (secretarías) and undersecretariats (subsecretarías); there are currently three of these:

Secretariat of Cultural Development (Secretaría de Desarrollo Cultural)
Secretariat of Cultural Administration (Secretaría de Gestión Cultural)
Secretariat of Cultural Heritage (Secretaría de Patrimonio Cultural)

The Secretariat of Cultural Heritage, through the National Directorate of Museums, is tasked with overseeing and maintaining all of Argentina's national museums, such as the National Museum of Fine Arts, the National Historical Museum, the Sarmiento Historical Museum, the National Bicentennial House, the Historical House of Independence, the National Cabildo Museum, among others. In addition, a number of decentralized institutions depend on the Ministry of Culture, such as the National Library of the Argentine Republic, the National Endowment for the Arts, the National Institute of Cinema and Audiovisual Arts (INCAA), and the National Institute of Music.

Headquarters
The Ministry of Culture is headquartered in the Casey Palace, a residential manor originally built for the Irish Argentine businessman Eduardo Casey. The building was designed by the United States-born architect Carlos Ryder and finished in 1889. It is located at the intersection of Alvear Avenue and Rodríguez Peña street, in the Buenos Aires barrio of Recoleta.

List of Ministers

References

External links
 

Culture
Argentina
Argentine culture
2014 establishments in Argentina
Argentina